The Longboat Pass Bridge (also known as Longboat Key Bridge) is a single-leaf bascule bridge that crosses the Longboat Pass, connecting Longboat Key and Bradenton Beach, Florida. The bridge also carries Gulf of Mexico Drive, part of SR 789. It was built in 1957, replacing an old swing bridge built in 1921.

The Longboat Pass Bridge is designated by the 1965 Legislature of Florida.

References

See also 
Anna Maria Island Bridge
Cortez Bridge

Road bridges in Florida
Transportation buildings and structures in Manatee County, Florida